The Fun Bunch were the wide receivers and tight ends of the Washington Redskins of the National Football League during the early 1980s. It was also used as a nickname for the corps of talented offensive players during Ohio State's 2005 and 2006 football seasons.

Washington Redskins

Known for their choreographed group celebrations in the end zone (usually a group high-five) following a touchdown, the Fun Bunch's actions eventually resulted in a league-wide ban of "excessive celebration" in 1984.

The members of the Fun Bunch included the Redskins' wide receivers Art Monk, Virgil Seay, Charlie Brown, and Alvin Garrett, running back Otis Wonsley and tight ends Rick Walker, and Don Warren.  Each won a Super Bowl with the Redskins, and three were chosen for the Pro Bowl. Art Monk was inducted into the Pro Football Hall of Fame.

The first high-five leap performed by the Fun Bunch occurred after an Alvin Garrett touchdown in a 1982 first round playoff game against the Detroit Lions.

In the Fun Bunch, there was a sub-group nicknamed the Smurfs.  The Smurfs consisted of Virgil Seay, Alvin Garrett, and Charlie Brown. The three were given the nickname because of their diminutive size (Garrett was 5'7", Seay known as Papa Smurf was 5'8", and Brown the tallest at 5'10"), comparing them to the tiny blue comic and cartoon characters in The Smurfs.

Ohio State football
"The Fun Bunch" was also used for the offensive players during Ohio State's 2005 and 2006 football seasons: wide receivers Anthony Gonzalez, Ted Ginn Jr., Santonio Holmes and quarterback Troy Smith. Although the nickname was initially employed only at the insistence of Columbus-based WSYX-TV sports anchor Clay Hall, its usage gained momentum in other media as the Buckeyes ran the table during the 2006 regular season leading up to their title-game loss to the Florida Gators.

See also
 List of NFL nicknames

References

Nicknamed groups of American football players
Washington Commanders